Ten Mile Run or Tenmile Run may refer to:

 Ten Mile Run (New Jersey), a tributary of the Millstone River
 Ten Mile Run, New Jersey, a census-designated place and unincorporated community in Somerset County
 Tenmile Run (Susquehanna River), in Columbia County, Pennsylvania